Reston is a railway station in the small village of Reston that serves the wider rural parish of Coldingham and nearby small town of Eyemouth in the eastern Scottish Borders council area. The station is a minor stop on the East Coast Main Line and opened on 23 May 2022 after a £20 million investment. The station is owned by Network Rail and managed by ScotRail, although the latter company does not provide any services to or from the station. It is the second railway station to have been located in the village, having replaced an earlier station that closed in 1964.

History

Original station
One of the original stations was Reston, which was flanked by  towards Edinburgh and  towards Berwick. The initial service was of five trains each way on weekdays, and two on Sundays.

The main line ran roughly east–west through Reston, but turned to the south-east in the eastbound direction.

In 1904 the station (then listed as Reston for Coldingham and St. Abbs) was able to handle all classes of traffic (goods, passengers, parcels, wheeled vehicles, livestock, etc.) and there was a goods crane capable of lifting .

Maps of the period show that Reston station had platforms on both sides of the double-track main line which were linked by a footbridge; the station building was on the northern (eastbound) platform; the platform for the single-track Duns line was on the north side of that line; the goods yard with its crane was on the north side of the main line on the western side of the station; and that the junction was to the east of the station. The maps also show sidings close to the junction, a weighing machine in the goods yard, a turntable in the angle between the two routes, a signal box near the junction and several signals.

Decline and closure
The St. Boswells line was cut back to Duns following flood damage on 12 August 1948. The Duns branch closed to passengers on 10 September 1951, and to freight on 16 July 1965. Reston and Grantshouse stations were listed for closure in the first Beeching report, and duly closed on 4 May 1964; Ayton had closed on 5 February 1962.

The remaining infrastructure at Reston consists of two engineer's sidings, one on each side, and two crossovers  from Edinburgh Waverley.

Reopening

Proposals to reopen the station received the backing of John Lamont MSP, who took the case to the Scottish Parliament. A study published in 2013 proposed that  and Reston stations be reopened.

In 2019, Transport Scotland confirmed that the station would be operational by 2024. The outline plans for the new station included  platforms either side of the Berwick-to-Edinburgh line, long enough to accommodate a 10-carriage train, as well as an accessible footbridge, shelters and a 70-space car park with provision for expansion in the future. The planning application for the new station was submitted in December 2020 and approved in February 2021.

Construction of the £20 million station began in March 2021 and involved the closure of the line during a weekend in September 2021 to enable the station footbridge to be installed.

The station opened on 23 May 2022 with Transpennine Express and London North Eastern Railway providing the first southbound and northbound services respectively.

Services 
There is a reduced service on Sundays.

It has previously been suggested that, beyond 2023, the station might be served by a two-hourly Newcastle and Berwick-upon-Tweed to Edinburgh service.

References

Bibliography

External links

Reston Station on navigable 1947 O.S. map
Photographs of Reston at Railscot

Railway stations in the Scottish Borders
Former North British Railway stations
Railway stations in Great Britain opened in 1846
Railway stations in Great Britain closed in 1964
Railway stations in Great Britain opened in 2022
Beeching closures in Scotland
1846 establishments in Scotland
Railway stations served by London North Eastern Railway
Railway stations served by TransPennine Express
Railway stations in Great Britain not served by their managing company